Luca Bertoni (born 19 June 1992) is an Italian professional footballer who plays as a midfielder for  club Pro Patria.

Club career
Bertoni started his football career at Milan, playing in their youth team. On 11 July 2012, after finishing his youth formation with Milan, he joined Südtirol in a season-long loan, and made his senior debuts with the Prima Divisione side.

On 12 July 2013, Bertoni moved to Serie B side Carpi in a co-ownership deal with Milan. He made his division debut on 24 August, starting in a 0–1 loss at Ternana.

He returned in 2014 to the previous team Südtirol, in the Lega Pro.

On 18 July 2016, Bertoni completed a loan move to Albanian Superliga side Partizani Tirana. The club also had the option to make the move permanent at the end of the season. He was handed squad number 70, and made his competitive debut on 3 August in the returning leg of Champions League third qualifying round against Red Bull Salzburg, playing in the last two minutes in an eventual 2–0 away defeat (3–0 on aggregate). Bertoni made his first Albanian Superliga appearance in the opening league match on 7 September against Luftëtari Gjirokastër, playing full-90 minutes in a 1–0 win. Following the dismissal of Adolfo Sormani, Bertoni did not play in October, and on 25th, he terminated his contract with the club by mutual consent.

On 3 July 2018, Bertoni signed for Italian club Pro Patria in an undisclosed fee.

References

External links 

1992 births
Living people
People from Vizzolo Predabissi
Footballers from Lombardy
Italian footballers
Association football midfielders
Serie B players
Serie C players
A.C. Milan players
F.C. Südtirol players
A.C. Carpi players
Aurora Pro Patria 1919 players
Kategoria Superiore players
FK Partizani Tirana players
Italian expatriate footballers
Italian expatriate sportspeople in Albania
Expatriate footballers in Albania
Sportspeople from the Metropolitan City of Milan